Christiaan Antonius Lindemans (24 October 1912 – 18 July 1946) was a Dutch double agent during the Second World War, working under Soviet control. Otherwise known as Freddi Desmet, a Belgian army officer and SOE agent with security clearance at the Dutch Military Intelligence Division of the SOE (MID/SOE). He was known by the soubriquets "King Kong" (for his height and build) or in some circles as "le Tueur" ("The Killer")
 as he was reportedly ready to shoot at the slightest provocation. There is speculation that Lindemans was a member of Colonel Claude Dansey's Z organisation.
 

He has been blamed for betraying  Operation Market Garden and as a result helped the Germans win the battle of Arnhem in 1944. The loss of this battle prolonged the war for six months and allowed the Red Army to enter Berlin first.

Krist, as he was called by comrades, had worked for the Allies, being personally responsible for the death of at least twenty-seven Germans during the guerrilla war in the outskirts of Antwerp.

Biography

He was the fourth son of Joseph Hendrik Lindemans and Christina Antonia van Uden. Before the outbreak of the Second World War, Lindemans worked alongside his elder brother Jan as a mechanic at his father's garage in Rotterdam. In the summer of 1936, he was injured in a motorcycle accident where he sustained a cracked skull and injuries to his left arm and leg which left him walking with a lumbering, simian-like, gait (described by some as a slight limp and a deformed hand). Tall and heavily built (6 ft 3 and 260 lbs), he was nicknamed "King Kong" (a name given to him by his rowing trainer). He spoke French and German well and some English.

By his own account, Lindemans started work as an informant for the British Secret Service in the spring of 1940, relaying shipping movements to London. In August of that year, he found work as lorry driver on the Lille to Paris route, transporting petrol for the Luftwaffe. While living in Lille, and through his girlfriend (who later became his wife), he became involved with the French Resistance sometime in 1940. Around September 1942, he established his own escape line in Abbeville, where he was arrested two months later after being denounced by a woman living in Paris, an acquaintance named Colette. He was imprisoned by the Germans for five months and was the only member of his organisation to be detained.

By 1943, his popularity as one of the leaders of the Dutch resistance was its highest. He had begun collecting jewels and other valuables from rich women to provide fighting funds for an underground "escape route" through occupied Belgium and the Netherlands into Spain and Portugal.

Lindemans had regular contact with resistance movements, some with communist tendencies such as the Raad van Verzet or Council of Resistance (which engaged in both communications sabotage and the protection of onderduikers, i.e. people in hiding)), the CS VI group of Amsterdam (a clandestine sabotage and intelligence organisation, one of whose members was Dutch Captain Kas de Graaf,) the Trouw (Fidelity), the Het Parool (The Spoken Word), the Dutch-Paris escape line run by John Henry Weidner and evasion networks within the jurisdiction of MI9.
Lindemans was a member of one of the 12 recognised units of the Belgian underground army called fr:Les Affranchis (The Liberated, ranked 12, founded by Camille Tromme), allowing him to possess a machine gun and a revolver.

Sometime in February 1944, his younger brother Hendrik ("Henk") was arrested in Rotterdam by the Sicherheitspolizei and held captive at The Hague, to await execution for helping English people escape from the Netherlands. Followed on 24 February by the arrest of his wife, who was then three months pregnant with her second child, a French cabaret singer who worked for the French Resistance named Gilberte Letuppe (she had previously worked as an ambulance driver for the French Red Cross) nicknamed Gilou Lelup at the Hotel Montholon in the 9th arrondissement of Paris. 

The arrest was made by two members of the Gestapo, assisted by four heavily armed German soldiers. They searched her bag and her room and found three ID cards, Kommandantur signatures, pass and German employment permits, all stolen the previous day. In addition to the items discovered, three revolvers and a box of ammunition, to be handed over to a French resistance movement in Bordeaux (Lindemans was there at the time of his wife's arrest) were confiscated. 
Lindemans' wife, a member of Swane's organisation, operated under the aliases of "Anna Van Vredenburgh" and "Yvonne". Among others that were arrested was Victor "Vic" Swane, the head of an escape network. 

Letuppe was taken prisoner and interrogated for 11 hours that day. She was beaten with such force in the face that she fell from her chair, but she refused to speak. She was then taken to Fresnes Prison, south of Paris, where she was jailed, manacled by hand and feet, and was given no food or water for four days. She was questioned violently a couple of times (twenty-four), beaten in the face on every occasion. Due to her refusal to speak, she spent the next six months in solitary confinement.

She is registered, at the beginning of August, to be the last woman admitted to Fort de Romainville, a stop before deportation. Her file, numbered 6 862, described her as having been born on 15 September 1922 and being nine months pregnant ("9 Monat schwanger"). But, instead, being among the prisoners aboard the last convoy (I.264, 15 August 1944) of deportees from Paris (quai des bestiaux, gare de Pantin) to Germany and, like some of her fellow inmates who were considered unfit for transportation, she was evacuated from the Fort of Romainville on 17 August to a local Hospice in Saint-Denis where she gave birth on 25 August 1944 to her second child, a daughter named Christianne. Letuppe's release may have been ordered by Abwehr Colonel Oscar Reile. He supposedly left Paris on 18 August. The fort of Romainville was under the control of the German military authorities.
 
Her testimony was later written down by the Allied Information Service (AIS)-SHAEF and used as evidence in the Nuremberg trials.

By March 1944, Christiaan was able to initiate contact with the Abwehr operatives in Brussels, due to his inability to pay 10,000 Florins asked by the first intermediary agent in exchange for their freedom, Lindemans agreed to meet Dr Gerhard, sometimes called "Dr German" (pseudonym for Hermann Giskes, who had run the successful Operation North Pole and who could speak perfect English without a trace of a German accent.) in a villa outside Brussels and agreed to become a double agent on condition that his wife and brother were released. Giskes claimed that he performed his part of the bargain, Henk Lindemans was released in due course and went as a voluntary worker to Germany where he had some acquaintances

From here on, Christiaan Lindemans (Abwehr codenamed CC) was instructed to renew contact with resistance agents and transmit back to Major Hermann Giskes information about the resistance movement in the occupied Netherlands, France and Belgium. In return, he received large sums of money. During his time as an informant for the German military intelligence service, he was closely shadowed by an Abwehr agent. Lindemans' early denunciations created a Domino effect resulting in the arrest of 267 members of the Dutch and Belgian Resistance. In the wake of the D-Day's landings, Lindemans was said to have "visited" the British sector of the Normandy beachhead and succeeded in getting himself recruited by IS 9 (Intelligence School 9 a.k.a. Nine Eyes) Western Europe Area, an Anglo-American secret agency which worked under MI9, by the end of September 1944, he was a member of Prince Bernhard's Staff and was appointed liaison officer (with temporary rank of Captain in the Netherlands Forces of the Interior) between Dutch resistance and a British Intelligence unit commanded by a Canadian officer.

The true nature of Lindemans' mission could have been an assassination attempt against Prince Bernhard, but according to Bernhard's biographer these were not his orders. Lindemans was to spy on Prince Bernhard's HQ and find out who was the primary source of intelligence (contacts in the Dutch resistance, radio operators and other suppliers of information).

September 1944
On 3 September 1944, Giskes left Brussels (en route to his next assignment in Bonn, Giskes' FAK 307 was now attached to Army Group B) and instructed Lindemans to stay in Belgium and make contact with Anglo-Canadian intelligence. He was to offer himself as an agent, the mission was to find out what plans Canadian Intelligence had made for the Netherlands and as soon as possible cross the lines with that information, in that case he was to use a secret code to get past German sentries. Lindemans, involved in the liberation of the city of Brussels, alongside three Belgian police officers, attacked German forces who were still holding out in the North railway station district. Lindemans killed two German soldiers and wounded two others.

On 4 September 1944, British intelligence officer, Captain Peter Baker of IS 9 of the D group (Western Europe Area), an expert in sabotage and hand-to-hand combat and assigned to SHAEF G-2 division (intelligence), arrived in Brussels (office at the Hotel Metropole where he set up a W/T station) on his way to newly liberated Antwerp in search of a Dutchman who would be able to go through the lines and contact Allied airmen hiding in the southern part of the Netherlands (Allied pilots were to stay put as the Allied armies were preparing to move toward Eindhoven).

An Armée secrète 's operative named Urbain Renniers recommended Lindemans for the job, before sending him out, Baker made a few enquiries, he then went to the 21st Army Group's headquarters which in turn contacted Prince Bernhard's staff, on SHAEF Special Forces Captain de Graaf's recommendation, Prince Bernhard notify Baker that Lindemans could be trusted. Accordingly, special priority clearance was granted and an IS 9 pass in the name of Christiaan Brand was issued.

Lindemans, operating under the alias of "De Vries" which was given to him by Baker to protect his identity, had now joined The Buccaneers, Baker's private army, the Jolly Roger was the unit Battle standard. The De Vries alias was also used by another Abwehr agent, Antonie Damen. Lindemans was required to be Baker's chauffeur. The Baker mission (It is conceivable that it was part of an elaborate deception operation) beginning on 12–13 September from the Belgium town of Diest.

On the night of 14 September, Captain Baker ordered Lindemans and a Belgian named Lucien de Ness to Hechtel-Eksel near Beringen (location of Capt Baker HQ, the British intended to drive onto Eindhoven with 300 tanks from the bridgehead near Beringen). For most of his journey, Lindemans, wearing full British battle dress, was escorted by a patrol of 14 British soldiers under the authority of a Major Ross (pseudonym for a British officer). Lindemans and de Ness crossed the frontline near Valkenswaard through a hail of shells. de Ness was seriously wounded and was taken to a German field hospital, where he died shortly after. For Lindemans, he had a rendezvous with German headquarters in the Netherlands.

Lindemans first met with German Luftwaffe general Kurt Student in Vught and then escorted to Driebergen by Giskes' right-hand man, Abwehr agent Richard Christmann (1905–1989) who had been detached from FAK 307 to FAT 365 in the upcoming meeting with Lindemans. The latter was driven back to the region of Eindhoven on 16 September by agent Christmann (codenamed Arnaud).

Alongside his BBO assignment, Lindemans had received a Dutch BI (bureau of information, The Dutch exile government's intelligence service and MI-6 counterpart) order by Baker, that once in Eindhoven he was to deliver personally to four high-ranking members of a Dutch resistance organisation, all employed by The Philips Company also known as Eindhoven Philips the following assignment that they should hold back information on the development of V-2 rocket and a cyclotron until the Allies reached them unless they considered it to be a strategic imperative. In that case, they were to hand their intelligence to Lindemans on his way back through the lines and to prevent the Germans from committing acts of sabotage against Philips' factories.

Possibly part of the Melanie Mission, a joint operation between the Office of Strategic Services and the BI, the Melanie Mission was to collect military, economic and industrial intelligence.

On Saturday 16 September, he went to the safe house of resistance police officer Inspector Kooy, whose address had been given to Lindemans via Baker by Dutch intelligence liaison officers. Kooy started to suspect Lindemans, had him searched, and a copy of the Deutsche Zeitung in den Niederlanden and a pass signed by Major Ernest Kiesewetter, head of FAT 365 in Driebergen (Giskes' subordinate and successor) was discovered in his pocket, Lindemans answered that he had picked up the newspaper on the road and the document bearing Kiesewetter's signature was a forgery. Unconvinced by Lindemans' explanation, Kooy had him locked up in a coal cellar near the police station .

Lindemans was released on Tuesday, 19 September, one day after the Allies entered Eindhoven by Baker who was absolutely furious that one of his best agents had been detained. Kooy produced the items that he had discovered on Lindemans, only for Baker to say that the newspaper meant nothing and the pass was a fake. 
On 23 September, Lindemans was debriefed and cleared of any suspicion by Captain de Graff (A coded telegram was sent to the BI HQ in London noting that Lindemans was all right) and Captain de Jong who had recently arrived from England and who was also serving on Prince Bernhard's Staff.

On duty with the SOE and in company of two British officers, Lindemans paid a visit to French resistance fighter, Charles Buisine on 17 October. Buisine, a veteran of the Battle of France, had been recruited into the SOE in 1940 by Lindemans with the immediate rank of Lieutenant, he was head of an intelligence and escape network codenamed Sector 6-North-F (stretching from the neighbouring of Orchies to Lille) with HQ in Beuvry. Buisine codenamed agent 28/24, who was working under the authority of Belgian Officer Desmet, was unaware of his commanding officer's true identity.

Waiting to be alone with Buisine, Lindemans said:

In the following days, Buisine learnt, to his own disbelief, that Freddi Desmet, SOE Captain of the Belgian army with an impeccable track record and Christiaan Lindemans, one of the leaders of the Communist group CS VI of Amsterdam who was being held prisoner by the British Military Police on suspicion of treason, were the same.

Tactical advantage
Since the war, various authors have speculated that Lindemans' information led Field Marshal Model (The Tafelberg Hotel was Model's Tactical HQ in Oosterbeek in the neighbouring of Arnhem and the Hartenstein Hotel was used as the German Officers' Mess. Model moved to Oosterbeek on 11 September.) to reposition the II SS Panzer Corps (commanded by General Bittrich whose headquarters were in Doetinchem 15 miles east of Arnhem.) under the cover of darkness to positions overlooking likely Airborne targets, mainly bridgeheads, near Arnhem<ref>:'The Sword of St Michael: The 82nd Airborne Division in World War II, by Guy Lofaro, published by Da Capo Press.</ref> and for the troops. They were camping in the nearby forests waiting for Allied airdrop to begin.

According to Lindemans, the Allies wanted to attack Eindhoven. More specifically, Lindemans' information stated that an Allied attack would be north of Eindhoven and would consist of Airborne troops eventually being backstopped by Allied armour.

Lindemans' information (report dated 22 August) was incomplete but enough to let the German High Command (Oberkommando der Wehrmacht) pinpoint enemy targets, most likely the bridges at Grave, Nijmegen and Arnhem. 

The last-mentioned was brought forward in Lindeman's report. In early September, Field Marshall Model who had the task of defending a line running from the North Sea to the Swiss border (500 miles), had ordered the 9th SS Panzer Division Hohenstaufen and the 10th SS Panzer Division Frundsberg to Arnhem for refitting and upgrading under the direction of Bittrich who would set up his command post in the area in preparation for the upcoming Allied invasion of Germany in reaction to the V-2 campaign.

Lindemans' second report (dated 15 September) made into two summaries (general information and prospective aerial landings), enabled the Germans to counter-attack and send further reinforcements made up of auxiliary units from the Arnhem and Nijmegen areas.

The limited availability of German jet planes, most of the Me 262 were grounded due to the lack of fuel, made it impossible to fully use Lindemans' intelligence on the position of Eisenhower's HQ and the whereabouts of Allied battle tanks.

Allied aircraft reconnaissance, used on 11 and 16 September but not on the 15th due to bad weather, noted nothing critical being detected.

Prince Bernhard impersonation

On the eve of the liberation of Eindhoven, preceded by Sherman tanks, Baker entered the town of Valkenswaard, accompanied by Charles Muller, a French officer, the two men were driven through the town in an impressive black Cadillac limousine, quickly attracting devoted followers.

With his horn rimmed spectacles and his London-tailored uniform, Baker bore an uncanny resemblance to Prince Bernhard of the Netherlands, and, as expected, a large and enthusiastic crowd cheered Baker who politely replied by waving his hands in royal manner. At the end, Baker had to take refuge at the Irish Guards's HQ at Aalst near Eindhoven where some British and American journalists were waiting to interview the Commander-in-Chief of the Dutch Forces.

Baker acknowledged in his memoirs that pictures were taken that day.

Capture and death
On 26 October 1944, Lindemans was denounced as a German spy by fellow Abwehr agent Cornelis Johannes Antonius Verloop nicknamed Satan Face (Abwehr codenamed "Nelis"), a recipient of the German Cross in Gold. Verloop, who at that time was in Allied hands, claimed that Lindemans had betrayed Operation Market Garden to intelligence officer Kiesewetter on Friday, 15 September at the Abwehr station in Driebergen. "King Kong" showed no resistance to his arrest by British security officer Alfred Vernon Sainsbury of the Special Forces Detachment on the afternoon of 28 October 1944 at Prince Bernhard's headquarters at Château de La Fougeraie also known as Château Wittouck in Uccle, outside of Brussels. 

After five days in St-Gilles-Prison, Brussels, Lindemans was transferred to Camp 020 (A maximum-security prison), and placed under the command of Lieutenant colonel R.W.G. Stephens nicknamed Tin Eye. Lindemans' personal effects were seized but these provided no evidence of his betrayal.

Following an intense two-week interrogation by MI5 agents, Lindemans had several epileptic seizures and consequently, made a full and detailed confession and contrary to initial findings, compelled by Camp 020 officers that they were unable to report what information Lindemans had transmitted to the enemy, Colonel Stevens recommended that Lindemans should receive the death sentence. Lindemans' questioning at Camp 020 had revealed that he had general knowledge on some of Nazi Germany's top-secret weapons including the V-2 program and the existence of an atomic bomb that could burn and destroy everything within a radius of 500 yards, that large amounts of gold were stored in an unknown location in Brussels. He also disclosed that Giskes was a personal friend of Hitler. Lindemans was also suspected of helping German spies get back into enemy lines during October.

He returned to Dutch custody (7 December 1944) where he was jailed in Breda Prison up to March 1945 and in Scheveningen until summer 1946, held under sentence of death by the Dutch government, for treachery during the war.

Oreste Pinto did visit Lindemans at least once. The very muscular and keen boxer nicknamed "King Kong" was now a shadow of his former self, the two men looked at each other, Lindemans asked, "Is there no mercy?", Pinto did not reply. Lindemans allegedly committed suicide by swallowing 80 aspirin in a psychiatric ward before his case could be heard.

Prison, rumours and escape
In the summer of 1946, a Dutch newspaper published an article on a prison break which occurred at Scheveningen Prison. Three men who were being held at the camp for political delinquency escaped, with one of the escapees being Lindemans (a previous escape attempt by Lindemans from the same place having been thwarted), he may have been allowed to escape to South America after a body-swap.

Russian syndicate

In April 1946, Lindemans' wife visited the Soviet Embassy in Rotterdam, at least on three occasions. The British intelligence service took the matter seriously and intervened with the help of one of their agents inside Scheveningen Prison to get through to Lindemans, in exchange for his wife's safety, he agreed to share information on a Russian organisation that had ties with senior members of France, Germany and the Netherlands Armed forces and civilian administrations. This organisation is said to be all over the Netherlands and actively trying to absorb all Dutchmen who served in the SS during the war, had taken into custody German engineers who had worked on the German atomic project and exfiltrated them to the Soviet Union, the same group had now spread to Persia, possibly threatening British interests. The British intelligence service cross-checked Lindemans' report and found it to be very accurate.

The same mysterious organisation might have been involved in Verloop breaking out of Scheveningen Prison (1946). According to his British personal file, classified 'Red', Verloop was regarded by the British intelligence service as one of the most dangerous German spies to have worked in the Netherlands. He was last seen in 1949, reappearing decades later, although Lindemans was believed to have known where Verloop was hiding. Verloop's name was on the official list of German agents kept by Admiral Wilhelm Canaris in his office in Berlin.

During the 1980s, Verloop was interviewed by French historian, Michel Rousseau about two SOE networks in the north of France, the Garrow-Pat O'Leary network and the Farmer network. The article was printed in the French quarterly publication Revue d'histoire de la Deuxième Guerre mondiale et des conflits contemporains in 1984. He was also interviewed by American journalist, Brendan M. Murphy, for his projected book on British spy turned traitor Harold Cole, published in 1987.

In January 1944, posing as patriots, Verloop and fellow Abwehr agent, Antonie Damen, raised suspicion in the mind of one member of the Belgian resistance movement, Mrs Lambot of 15, rue d'Alliance, Brussels. Lambot lodged that Verloop and Damen, were suspected to be working for the Russian intelligence service. Damen's capture by Allied forces resulted in Verloop's capture as well.

Body exhumed

On Tuesday, 17 June 1986, Dutch pathologist Martin Voortman positively identified a skeleton exhumed as that of Christiaan Lindemans, according to Voortman, the skeleton had an irregularly healed break in its left ankle, consistent with Lindemans' medical records.
The body was recovered at dawn the same day from Rotterdam Crooswijk cemetery from a coffin sandwiched between those of Lindemans' parents.

Hendrik (Henk) Lindemans who witnessed the exhumation of his brother's body, stated that he was convinced that the remains were those of his brother.

In 1997, Lindemans' suicide note surfaced and had provided satisfactory evidence that Lindemans took his own life.

Film by Richard Attenborough
A close-up of a Beware, the Walls Have Ears poster can be seen in Richard Attenborough's 1977 film adaptation of Operation Market Garden, A Bridge Too Far''.

The Lindemans files
The NARA retains some files on Lindemans and the documents are located among the Office of the Secretary of Defense (RG 330) records. The Lindemans files are still security classified as late as 2015.

Notes

See also

References

External links
(subtitles translation into English) YouTube Channel: RTV Rijnmond Extra's Tv-Programm Vergeten Verhalen Aflevering 7 on The Exhumation Of The Remains Of Christiaan Lindemans

Dutch prisoners sentenced to death
Special Operations Executive personnel
Royal Netherlands Army personnel
Dutch people of World War II
Dutch collaborators with Nazi Germany
World War II spies for the Soviet Union
World War II spies for Germany
Double agents
1912 births
1946 suicides
People from Rotterdam
World War II espionage
Drug-related suicides in the Netherlands
Prisoners sentenced to death by the Netherlands